The Helsinki Grand Prix (World Games in English) was an annual one-day outdoor track and field meeting held at the Helsinki Olympic Stadium in Helsinki, Finland. Established in 1959, it was originally organised by a local athletics club, Helsingin Kisa-Veikot (HKV). It continued in this format, with Apu magazine a key sponsor, for nearly three decades. In 1987, HKV came to an agreement where the Finnish Amateur Athletic Association took on the operating costs of the competition. The Finnish Association ceased this arrangement in 1992, causing the cancellation of the 1993 meeting due to financial difficulties.

Following the successful hosting the 1994 European Athletics Championships in Helsinki, the meeting was rebooted and incorporated into the annual IAAF Grand Prix series upon that competition's founding in 1998. It continued to be a high-level meeting for international athletes, and was again included the top bracket upon the creation of the IAAF World Athletics Tour in 2005. During this period it had title sponsors and was known as the Ericsson Grand Prix (1998–2000), Asics Grand Prix (2001–2004) and GE Money Grand Prix (2005–2006). However, the 2006 meeting proved to be its last and the meeting folded in 2007.

Best athlete prize

At each competition, the best athlete of the meet would be presented with a sculpted glass prize.

Meet records

References

External links
GE Money Grand Prix Records

IAAF Grand Prix
Annual track and field meetings
Athletics competitions in Finland
Sports competitions in Helsinki
1959 establishments in Finland
Recurring sporting events established in 1959
Recurring sporting events disestablished in 2007
IAAF World Outdoor Meetings